Denis Franchi (born 22 October 2002) is an Italian professional footballer who plays as a goalkeeper for  club Burnley.

Career
The first club that Franchi joined in his career was ACD Pravisdomini. He also went on to play for U.S. Opitergina before joining ASD Prata Falchi Visinale. From 2018 to 2019, Franchi was on loan at Udinese. He joined the Paris Saint-Germain Academy in July 2019. On 30 November 2020, Franchi signed his first professional contract with Paris Saint-Germain, a deal that would last until 2023.

On 26 August 2022, Franchi signed for EFL Championship club Burnley on a three-year contract.

Personal life 
Born in San Vito al Tagliamento, Franchi originates from Pordenone in Italy's northeast. He is a supporter of AC Milan.

References

External links
 
 
 
 

2002 births
Living people
People from San Vito al Tagliamento
Sportspeople from Friuli-Venezia Giulia
Italian footballers
Association football goalkeepers
Udinese Calcio players
Paris Saint-Germain F.C. players
Burnley F.C. players
Championnat National 3 players
Italy youth international footballers
Italian expatriate footballers
Italian expatriate sportspeople in France
Italian expatriate sportspeople in England
Expatriate footballers in France
Expatriate footballers in England